The voiced alveolar approximant is a type of consonantal sound used in some spoken languages. The equivalent X-SAMPA symbol is r\.

For further ease of typesetting, English phonemic transcriptions might use the symbol  even though this symbol represents the alveolar trill in phonetic transcription.

The bunched or molar r sounds remarkably similar to the postalveolar approximant and can be described as a voiced labial pre-velar approximant with tongue-tip retraction.

Features

Features of the voiced alveolar approximant:

Occurrence

Alveolar

Postalveolar

As an allophone of other rhotic sounds,  occurs in Edo, Fula, Murrinh-patha, and Palauan.

See also
 Index of phonetics articles

Notes

References

External links
 

Alveolar consonants
Pulmonic consonants
Oral consonants
Central consonants